Walter Hammersen (5 January 1911 – 10 October 1990) was a German politician of the Free Democratic Party (FDP) and former member of the German Bundestag.

Life 
Hammersen was a member of the Wiesbaden city council from 1954 to 1966. He was a member of the German Bundestag from 1961 to 1965. He had entered parliament via the state list of the FDP Hessen.

Literature

References

1911 births
1990 deaths
Members of the Bundestag for Hesse
Members of the Bundestag 1961–1965
Members of the Bundestag for the Free Democratic Party (Germany)